The third election to South Glamorgan County Council and was held in May 1977. It was preceded by the 1977 election and followed by the 1985 election.

Boundary changes
There were no boundary changes at this election.

Candidates
As in previous elections, Conservative and Labour candidates contested the vast majority of seats, with an increased number of Liberal candidates. There were a smaller number of Plaid Cymru and Ecology Party candidates and a few Independents.

Outcome
Having lost control of the authority in 1977, Labour regained control with sweeping gains across the wards. The Liberals also made some advances in central Cardiff.

Ward Results

Adamsdown (two seats)

Barry, Baruc (one seat)

Barry, Buttrills (one seat)

Barry, Cadoc (one seat)

Barry, Castleland (one seat)

Barry, Court (two seats)

Barry, Dyfan (two seats)

Barry, Illtyd (one seat)

Canton (two seats)

Cardiff Rural No.1 (one seat)

Cardiff Rural No.3, Dinas Powys (two seats)

Cardiff Rural No.4, Wenvoe (one seat)

Cardiff Rural No.5, Rhoose (one seat)

Cardiff South (two seats)

Cathays (three seats)

Central (two seats)

Cowbridge No.1 (one seat)

Cowbridge No.2 (two seats)

Ely (four seats)

Gabalfa (three seats)

Grangetown (two seats)

Lisvane, Llanedeyrn and St Mellons (one seat)

Llandaff (three seats)

Llanishen (four seats)

Penarth North/Central (one seats)

Penarth South Ward (two seats)

Penarth West (one seat)

Penylan (five seats)

Plas Mawr (four seats)
Former Labour MP Caerwyn Roderick was among the successful candidates in this ward. Former Penylan councilor Mary Hallinan sought to retain a seat for the Conservatives but was defeated.

Plasnewydd (two seats)

Rhiwbina (three seats)

Riverside (two seats)

Roath (three seats)

Rumney (five seats)

Splott (five seats)

Whitchurch (three seats)

References

1981 Welsh local elections
South Glamorgan County Council elections